Kuntur Wachana or Kuntur Wachanan (Quechua kuntur condor, wacha birth, to give birth, -na a suffix, 'where the condor is born', -n a suffix, also spelled Condor Huachana, Cóndorhuachana, Condor Wachana; Condorhuachanan, Cóndorhuachanan)  may refer to:

 Kuntur Wachana (Bolivia), a mountain in Bolivia
 Kuntur Wachana (Cusco), a mountain in the Cusco Region, Peru
 Kuntur Wachana (film), a Peruvian docudrama
 Kuntur Wachanan, a mountain in the Huánuco Region, Peru
 Kuntur Wachanan (Lima), a mountain in the Lima Region, Peru